Verner Toivonen (7 June 1908 – 19 February 2004) was a Finnish middle-distance runner. He competed in the men's 3000 metres steeplechase at the 1932 Summer Olympics.

References

1908 births
2004 deaths
Athletes (track and field) at the 1932 Summer Olympics
Finnish male middle-distance runners
Finnish male steeplechase runners
Olympic athletes of Finland
Place of birth missing